Aloysius Joseph "Allan" Travers, SJ, also known as Aloysius Stanislaus Travers (May 7, 1892 – April 19, 1968), was a Major League Baseball pitcher who made a one-game appearance during the 1912 strike of the Detroit Tigers. He is the only Catholic priest to have played major league baseball.

Travers was only playing because the Detroit Tigers team had refused to play after their teammate Ty Cobb had been suspended for attacking a heckler who called him a "half-nigger" during a game against the New York Yankees at Hilltop Park three days earlier.

Travers does not, as is often reported, hold the major league record for most hits or runs allowed in a game, although he does hold the major league record for earned runs in a single major league game.  The Cleveland Blues' Dave Rowe, who was primarily an outfielder, gave up 35 runs (12 earned) on 29 hits in a game played on July 24, 1882.  Travers does hold the two negative records for American League play.

Career
On May 15, Cobb had entered the stands at the end of the sixth inning after being taunted with racist abuse from a heckler. Claude Lueker, who due to an industrial accident had lost one complete hand and only had three fingers on the other, had repeatedly called Cobb 'a half nigger'. When Cobb began beating him, fans pleaded with him to stop hitting a man with no hands. But Cobb reportedly shouted back, "I don't care if he has no feet!".

American League president Ban Johnson, who was attending the game, responded by suspending Cobb indefinitely.  Cobb's teammates voted to strike in support, refusing to play until he was reinstated. When Johnson threatened Tigers owner Frank Navin with a $5,000 fine for every game in which they failed to field a team, Navin ordered manager Hughie Jennings to find replacement players.  As the Tigers were on the road in Philadelphia to play the Athletics, Jennings recruited eight "Tigers" from a neighborhood in North Philadelphia. Each man was paid $25; Travers took on the role of pitcher upon learning that the position would pay $50.

Detroit Tigers
Jennings found Allan Travers on a city street corner. The 20-year-old junior from Philadelphia's St. Joseph's College was a violinist in the student orchestra, but had never pitched a game in his life. He had even been unable to make the school's varsity baseball team. Instead, Travers served as the team's assistant manager, preparing game summaries for the school annual.

Yet on May 18, 1912, Travers became a starting pitcher in a major league baseball game, walking out onto the mound in front of 15,000 Philadelphia fans at Shibe Park to face the two-time defending World Series champions. Over the next few hours Travers pitched to some of the best players of the era, including Frank "Home Run" Baker, Eddie Collins, and Stuffy McInnis.

Under these unlikely circumstances, Travers pitched the sport's most unlikely complete game, allowing 26 hits, 24 runs, 14 earned runs, 7 walks and one strikeout. Travers faced 50 batters through 8 innings, and was tagged with the loss in the 24–2 decision.

After the embarrassing display, Johnson met personally with the striking Tigers and told them they would be banned  for life if the strike continued.  Ty Cobb urged his teammates to end the strike, and the Tigers complied.  Accordingly, the major league career of Allan Travers and all but one of the other replacement Tigers was cut short at one game.  The lone exception was Billy Maharg, who later played in one game for the 1916 Philadelphia Phillies, but is best known for his off-the-field involvement in the 1919 Black Sox Scandal.

Additionally, Tigers manager Hughie Jennings (age 43) and coaches Joe Sugden (age 41) and Deacon McGuire (age 48), each of whom previously had long and distinguished careers as players, played in the game for the Tigers.  For all three men, it was their only playing appearance of the 1912 season.  Jennings would play in only one more major league game, in 1918.  It was the final game of both Sugden's and McGuire's careers.  The unplanned appearance raised McGuire's career total to 26 Major League seasons, a record which would not be surpassed until 1993, by Nolan Ryan.  McGuire (who became the last player born during the Civil War to appear in a big-league game) also recorded two fielding assists in the game, for a career total of 1,859, which remains the all-time record for catchers.

Travers (0–1) never played again in the major leagues, preserving his career ERA at 15.75 and career WHIP at 4.13.

Later life and death
For years, Travers was reluctant to speak about his day as a major league ball player.  But many years later, he told his story in an interview with sportswriter Red Smith.  He recalled being asked to round up "as many fellows as I could find" to play for the Tigers.  Travers claims to have gone to the corner of 23rd and Columbia in Philadelphia where "a bunch of fellows were standing around the corner."  That "bunch of fellows" became the Detroit Tigers for a day.

When asked about his performance on the mound, Travers told Red Smith that he threw "slow curves" that day, because the A's were not used to them, and because manager Hughie Jennings told Travers not to throw any fastballs as he "was afraid I might get killed."

Travers later entered the Society of Jesus, also known as the Jesuits, and was ordained as a Catholic priest in 1926.  He is the only priest to have played major league baseball.  Travers taught at St. Francis Xavier High School in Manhattan and was later named Dean of Men at St. Joseph College.  From 1943 to 1968, he taught Spanish and religion at Saint Joseph's Preparatory School in Philadelphia.

Travers lived in Philadelphia, Pennsylvania for almost all of his life.  He died at Misericordia Hospital in 1968 at age 75.

References

External links

 New York Times Obituary for Father Travers
 SABR Biography of Allan Travers

1892 births
1968 deaths
20th-century American Jesuits
Major League Baseball pitchers
Baseball players from Philadelphia
Detroit Tigers players